A hem is a sown edge of cloth.

Hem may also refer to:

People
 Eugene A. Hem (1933–2006), American politician
 Hem Bunting (born 1985), Cambodian marathoner
 Hem Khorn, Cambodian politician
 Hem Kiry (born 1980), Cambodian swimmer
 Hem Lumphat (1976–2020), Cambodian swimmer
 Hem Raksmey (born 1983), Cambodian swimmer
 Hem Simay (born 1987), Cambodian footballer
 Hem Thon Ponleu (born 1990), Cambodian swimmer
 Hem Thon Vitiny (born 1993), Cambodian swimmer
 Hem Vejakorn (1904–1969), Thai artist and writer
 Tore Hem (born 1944), Norwegian wrestler
 Hem, a figure in the Book of Mormon

Places
Hem, Netherlands, a village in the Netherlands
Hem, Nord, France
Hem, Norway

Other uses
 Hẻm (alleyway), a vernacular urban planning form in Vietnam
 Hem (knitting), the edge of a piece of knitted fabric that is parallel to the rows of stitches
 Hem (band), an indie folk rock band based in New York City
 Hem (sheetmetal), a border treatment of sheetmetal parts
 Habitation extension module
 Helsinki-Malmi Airport, in Finland
 Hemba language, spoken in the Democratic Republic of the Congo
 Hermann (Amtrak station), Missouri, United States
 Hem, a mythical creature likened to a hemaraj
 Hemeprotein
 HEM – European type of I-beam